The Westmeath county hurling team represents Westmeath in hurling and is governed by Westmeath GAA, the county board of the Gaelic Athletic Association. The team competes in the Joe McDonagh Cup and the National Hurling League.

Westmeath's home ground is Cusack Park, Mullingar. The team's manager is Joe Fortune.

The team has never won the Leinster Senior Championship, the All-Ireland Senior Championship or the National League.

The team is nicknamed the Lake men.

History
The Westmeath hurlers experienced a successful period in the mid-1930s, when they won the Leinster League twice in succession, the Junior Championship in 1936, and beat Laois to qualify for the 1937 Leinster Senior final.

Rickards town's John 'Jobber' McGrath, who played for the county in the 1950s and 1960s, is regarded as Westmeath's greatest hurler, and as one of the greatest players never to have won an All-Ireland senior hurling title.

Westmeath played in the first division of the National Hurling League in 1985–86 and were the only team to beat Galway in an 18-month period. This team included the three Kilcoyne brothers and produced an All-Star award for David, who was the team's free taker and top scorer in 1986. The first All Star award for any Westmeath player in hurling or football.

In 2005, the county won the first Christy Ring Cup and thereby gained promotion to the 2006 Liam McCarthy Championship. In 2006, they beat Dublin in the first round of the Leinster Senior Hurling Championship before losing the semi final to Kilkenny in Mullingar by 14 points. They then lost to Waterford, Galway and, disappointingly, Laois before tamely losing a relegation playoff against Dublin on a scorching July day in Tullamore. Despite progress made in 2006, the GAA condemned the county's hurlers to the Christy Ring Cup - this time without the prospect of promotion. Further rule changes and a Christy Ring win in 2010 allowed Westmeath back into the 2011 Liam McCarthy.

Further progress came on 20 April 2008 with victory in the NHL (Division 2), winning the final against Carlow. That day also saw their footballing counterparts move into Division 1 of the NFL also, with a win over Dublin.

In 2015, the Westmeath minor hurlers surprised heavy favorites Wexford by two points in the Leinster quarter-final, the win has been regarded by the manager as the 'biggest result in history of Westmeath hurling'. The senior hurlers beat Carlow by two points in the Leinster Qualifier group and extended their winning run beating favorites, Antrim 1–21 to 0–7.

A famous victory over near rivals Offaly was achieved in May 2016 in the Leinster Championship. Westmeath led by some distance for the entire game before winning 2–21 to 1–10.

In September 2019, Westmeath announced Shane O'Brien as new manager after Joe Quaid's departure.

Current panel

INJ Player has had an injury which has affected recent involvement with the county team.
RET Player has since retired from the county team.
WD Player has since withdrawn from the county team due to a non-injury issue.

Current management team
Ratified on 23 September 2021:
Manager: Joe Fortune

Managerial history

Michael Ryan: 2014–2018
Joe Quaid: 2018–2019
Shane O'Brien: 2019–2021
Joe Fortune: 2021–

Players

Notable players

Captaincy
Cormac Boyle: 2021

All Stars
Westmeath has 1 All Star.

1986: David Kilcoyne

Honours

National
All-Ireland Senior B Hurling Championship
 Winners (3): 1975, 1984, 1991

 
All-Ireland Junior Hurling Championship
 Winners (1): 1936
Joe McDonagh Cup
 Winners (1): 2021
 Runners-up (2): 2018, 2019
Christy Ring Cup
 Winners (3): 2005, 2007, 2010
 Runners-up (1): 2008
 
National Hurling League Division 2A
 Winners (3): 2016, 2019, 2022
National Hurling League Division 2
 Winners (1): 2008
All Ireland Minor B Hurling Championship
 Winners (2): 1999, 2010
All-Ireland Under-21 B Hurling Championship
 Winners (2): 2000, 2003

Provincial
Leinster Senior Hurling Championship
 Runners-up (1): 1937
Leinster Junior Hurling Championship
 Winners (3): 1912, 1936, 1963
 Walsh Cup
 Winners (1): 1982
Kehoe Cup
 Winners (9): 1993, 1996, 1998, 2004, 2008, 2009, 2010, 2019, 2022

References

 
County hurling teams